Marijke, sometimes written as Mareike is a Dutch feminine given name. It is originally a diminutive of Mary. Phonetically, the name is said muh-rye´-kah/keh, preferably with a rolling “r”. People with this name include:

People with the given name Marijke include:
Princess Marijke (later "Princess Christina"), youngest daughter of Queen Juliana of the Netherlands
Marijke Abels (born 1948), Dutch visual artist and instructor
Marijke Amado (born 1954), Dutch television presenter
Marijke van Beukering-Huijbregts (born 1971), Dutch politician
Marijke Callebaut (born 1980), retired Belgian footballer
Marijke Djwalapersad (born 1951), Surinamese politician
Marijke Engelen (born 1961), Dutch synchronized swimmer
Marijke de Goey (born 1947), Dutch visual artist
Marijke van Haaren (born 1952), Dutch politician
Marijke Hanegraaf (born 1946), Dutch poet
Marijke Kegge (born 1957), Dutch sprint canoer
Marijke Mars (born 1965), American billionaire heiress and businesswoman
Marijke Moser (born 1946), Dutch-born Swiss middle and long-distance runner
Marijke Nel (born 1967), South African-born Canadian tennis player and former South African women's rugby union player.
Marijke Ruiter (born 1954), Dutch swimmer, 10-fold champion at the Paralympic Games
Marijke Schaar née Jansen (born 1944), Dutch tennis player
Marijke Verpoorten, Belgian researcher and professor at the University of Antwerp
Marijke Vos (born 1957), Dutch politician
Marijke van Warmerdam (born 1959), Dutch photographer, installation artist, and video artist

People with the given name Mareike include:
 Mareike Adams (born 1990), German rower
 Mareike Carrière (1954-2014), German actress, spokesperson and translator.
 Mareike Miller née Adermann (born 1990), German wheelchair basketball player

References

See also
Marieke
Mariken (disambiguation)

Dutch feminine given names